California Memory  is an American-bred Hong Kong based Thoroughbred racehorse.  He was one of the nominees of 2010-2011 Hong Kong Horse of the Year.

Background
California Memory is a grey gelding sired by Highest Honor out of the mare Kalpita.

Racing career
Acquired by Spanish buyers, California Memory began his racing career in both Spain and France named Portus Blendium and trained by Spanish trainer based in Chantilly, Carlos Laffon-Parias. He won one race from four starts as a three-year-old in 2009.

California Memory was sold and exported to Hong Kong. He finished unplaced on his only start of 2010. In 2011 he became one of Hong Kong's most successful racehorses, winning important races including the Hong Kong Gold Cup the Sha Tin Trophy and the Hong Kong Cup. In the last named race he defeated an international field which included Cirrus des Aigles and Ambitious Dragon. In 2012, California Memory wins the Hong Kong Cup again and became the first horse that win the cup twice.

References

 The Hong Kong Jockey Club – California Memory Racing Record
 The Hong Kong Jockey Club

2006 racehorse births
Racehorses bred in Kentucky
Racehorses trained in Hong Kong
Hong Kong racehorses
Thoroughbred family 22-b